Artistas Asesinos (also known as Doble A or AA) is a Mexican street gang that works as an enforcement wing of the Sinaloa Cartel in Ciudad Juárez.

References 

Organizations established in 2008
2008 establishments in Mexico
Gangs in Mexico
Street gangs
Sinaloa Cartel
Ciudad Juárez